1927 Emperor's Cup Final was the 7th final of the Emperor's Cup competition. The final was played at Meiji Jingu Gaien Stadium in Tokyo on October 30, 1927. Kobe Icchu Club won the championship.

Overview
Kobe Icchu Club with Takeo Wakabayashi and Tadao Takayama won their 1st title, by defeating defending champion, Rijo Shukyu-Dan 2–0.

Match details

See also
1927 Emperor's Cup

References

Emperor's Cup
1927 in Japanese football